The 1960 Queen's Birthday Honours in New Zealand, celebrating the official birthday of Elizabeth II, were appointments made by the Queen on the advice of the New Zealand government to various orders and honours to reward and highlight good works by New Zealanders. They were announced on 11 June 1960.

The recipients of honours are displayed here as they were styled before their new honour.

Knight Bachelor
 George Douglas Robb    – a consulting surgeon, of Auckland.

Order of the Bath

Companion (CB)
Military division
 Rear-Admiral John Michael Villiers  – lately on loan to the Royal New Zealand Navy.

Order of Saint Michael and Saint George

Knight Commander (KCMG)
 The Honourable Eruera Tihema Tirikatene – Minister of Forests, Minister in charge of the Government Printing and Stationery Department, and Associate to the Minister of Maori Affairs.

Companion (CMG)
 George Manning – of Christchurch. For services to education and local government.
 Robert McKeen – of Otaki. For services in public affairs as a trade unionist, Member of Parliament (1922–1954), and Speaker of the House of Representatives (1947–1950).

Order of the British Empire

Commander (CBE)
Civil division
 Samuel Thompson Barnett – Secretary for Justice and Controller-General of Prisons, Department of Justice.
 Michael Connelly  – of Dunedin. For services in the field of local government.
 Alfred Hayward – deputy chairman of the Dairy Board.
 The Honourable Fiame Mata'afa Faumuina Mulinu'u II – prime minister of Western Samoa.

Military division
 Captain Gillespie Hume Edwards  – Royal New Zealand Naval Reserve.

Officer (OBE)
Civil division
 Francis Cornelius Allerby – of Levin. For public services.
 Hugh Richard Jarvis Donald  – a medical practitioner, of Christchurch.
 Lewis Edward Harris – of Puketapu. For philanthropic and social-welfare services, especially in the interests of handicapped children.
 Charles John Hayward – a member of the Dunedin City Council.
 Frederick Arthur Kitchingham  – Crown solicitor, Greymouth (since 1921).
 Leslie John McDonald  – in recognition of his services as director of the New Zealand Standards Institute (1936–1959), and to education.
 Mamea Matatumua – lately acting Secretary for Samoan Affairs, Western Samoa.
 Bertram Henry Olsson – director of the Naval Research Laboratory, Auckland.
 Īhāia Pōrutu Puketapu – of Lower Hutt. For social welfare services to Māori youth.
 Norman Hargrave Taylor – director of the Soil Bureau.
 Harry Hugo Tombs – of Wellington. For services to art and music.

Military division
 Commander David Lennox Millar  – Royal New Zealand Naval Volunteer Reserve.
 Lieutenant-Colonel Denis Lumsden Wood  – Royal New Zealand Infantry Corps (Territorial Force).
 Wing Commander Ivan Reid Mitchell  – Royal New Zealand Air Force.

Member (MBE)
Civil division
 Robert William Stanley Botting – of Dunedin. For services in local-body affairs and to sport.
 Walter Godfrey Bowen – chief shearing instructor to the New Zealand Wool Board.
 Margaret Elizabeth Callan – of Auckland. For community services, especially through the Crippled Children's Society.
 The Reverend John Gilman Sharp Dunn – president of the CORSO Council and clerk of the General Assembly of the Presbyterian Church of New Zealand.
 Archer Garside  – of Onehunga. For services to local government.
 Mabel Winifred Gunn – matron of the Whataroa Hospital, South Westland.
 George Alfred Harris – mayor of Temuka]. For municipal and patriotic services.
 Andrew Jacob Haub  – of New Plymouth. For services in connection with New Zealand justices of the peace.
 Lucy Eva Johnston – matron of the Abbotsford Home for Boys and Girls, Waipawa, and matron-in-charge, St Hilda's Home.
 Mabel Elizabeth Jolly – of Cromwell. For services to education, especially through the Correspondence School Parents' Association.
 Ivy Hazel Fletcher Jones  – secretary-manager, Auckland Methodist Children's Home and Orphanage.
 David Erskine Sinclair Mason  – engineer to the Southland Harbour Board.
 George Miller – of Wellington. For services to the community, especially amongst young people, and in the field of sport.
 Donald George Alfred Munro – of Wellington. For services to music.
 Oscar Gerald Smith – of Wellington. For services rendered under the auspices of the Returned Soldiers' Association.
 Eileen Hannah Spencer – of Palmerston North. For social-welfare services.
 Hone Te Kauru Taiapa – of Rotorua. For cultural services to the Māori people, especially in the field of wood carving.

Military division
 Warrant Officer First Class Neville William Faithful – New Zealand Regiment (Regular Force).
 Major Ronald Norman Griggs – Royal New Zealand Armoured Corps (Regular Force).
 Warrant Officer Second Class George Tom Holden   – Royal New Zealand Armoured Corps (Territorial Force).
 Major (temporary) Douglas Ronald Orange  – Royal New Zealand Army Service Corps (Territorial Force).
 Major (temporary) and Quartermaster Gordon William Stanley  – Royal New Zealand Army Medical Corps (Regular Force).
 Flight Lieutenant William Francis Reece Jackson – Royal New Zealand Air Force.
 Warrant Officer Robert Thomas Francis Lewis – Royal New Zealand Air Force.

Companion of the Imperial Service Order (ISO)
 Kenneth John Caverhill – lately director of the State Advances Corporation.
 Edward Stephen Gale – lately Comptroller of Customs, Customs Department.

British Empire Medal (BEM)
Civil division
 Lawrence Gordon – temporary sergeant, New Zealand Police Force.
 George Innes – sergeant, New Zealand Police Force.

Military division
 Chief Petty Officer Frederick Maurice Glasson – Royal New Zealand Naval Volunteer Reserve.
 Chief Petty Officer George Frederick Marshall – Royal New Zealand Navy.
 Chief Petty Officer Cook (S) Gerald Victor Baldwin Martin – Royal New Zealand Navy.
 Chief Electrical Artificer Robert Thomas Noble Moffat – Royal New Zealand Navy.
 Staff-Sergeant (temporary) John Arthur Baker – Royal New Zealand Dental Corps (Regular Force).
 Sergeant (temporary) Douglas Alexander Branks – Royal New Zealand Infantry Corps (Territorial Force).
 Staff-Sergeant Douglas Donald Hamilton – Royal New Zealand Infantry Corps (Territorial Force).
 Staff Sergeant Johnston Henry Robert Love  – Royal New Zealand Infantry Corps (Territorial Force).
 Staff Sergeant Alexander George Metcalfe – Corps of Royal New Zealand Electrical and Mechanical Engineers (Regular Force).
 Flight Sergeant William Alexander – Royal New Zealand Air Force.
 Sergeant Horace Floyd Williams – Royal New Zealand Air Force.

Air Force Cross (AFC)
 Master Signaller James Alfred Easton – Royal New Zealand Air Force.

Queen's Police Medal (QPM)
 Orme Snow Wilson Power – assistant commissioner, New Zealand Police Force.

Queen's Commendation for Valuable Service in the Air
 Flight Lieutenant Colin William Rudd – Royal New Zealand Air Force.
 Sergeant Engineer Raymond William Tocker – Royal New Zealand Air Force.

References

Birthday Honours
1960 awards
1960 in New Zealand
New Zealand awards